Wilkenfeld is a surname. Notable people with the surname include:

Jonathan Wilkenfeld (born 1942), American political scientist
Tal Wilkenfeld (born 1986), Australian singer, songwriter, bassist, and guitarist